Love My Way is an Australian television drama series. It won the AFI award for Best Television Drama Series for each of its three seasons (2004–2007).

Premise
Set in Sydney, Love My Way was about a group of 30-somethings dealing with the ups and downs of life. The series revolves around an extended family unit - Frankie Paige and Charlie Jackson are the separated parents of Lou, and Frankie also lives with Charlie's brother, Tom. As the series began, Charlie's new wife Julia is about to have their first child. Frankie's mother, Di and Charlie's mother, Brenda, and father, Gerry, also have a strong presence in the ongoing story, as does Julia's ex-lover Howard, who enters into a relationship with Frankie.

Production
Produced by John Edwards and Claudia Karvan, Love My Way starred Karvan, Sam Worthington, Dan Wyllie, Asher Keddie, Brendan Cowell, and Alex Cook. As the program was made for subscription television in Australia, it contained stronger material than most Australian programs: regular swearing, drug use and sexual references.

When the series was launched, much was made of the connection between Love My Way and The Secret Life of Us: both sharing a star, as well as significant creative talent (Edwards and Perske both were involved in Secret Life, as were series writers like Tony McNamara). However, the series is not a continuation of Secret Life, although it does share some thematic concerns.

The star of the series, Claudia Karvan, is also a co-producer, along with having written for the series. Brendan Cowell, who appears as Tom, also worked as script writer for two episodes of seasons 1 and three episodes of season 2.

On first airing, the theme song originally by The Psychedelic Furs, this time covered by Magic Dirt, played over the title sequence. Some scenes were filmed on location at the infamously dangerous Cromwell Park.

Subscription television
The series premiered on FOX8 on 22 November 2004 during the late summer months when commercial TV is in a non-ratings period. During the second season it was moved to W. Channel. In 2007, for its third season, it screened on Showtime. Foxtel has been criticised for moving the show to different channels to encourage viewing of the W. Channel and then for moving the program to Showtime which is not included in the basic package of subscription television in Australia.

Cast

Main cast
 Claudia Karvan as Francesca "Frankie" Paige
 Asher Keddie as Julia Jackson
 Brendan Cowell as Tom Jackson
 Daniel Wyllie as Charlie Jackson
 Lynette Curran as Brenda Jackson
 Alex Cook as Louise "Lou" Jackson Paige
 Gillian Jones as Di Paige
 Max Cullen as Gerry Jackson

Recurring/guest stars
 Ben Mendelsohn  as Lewis Feingold
 Sam Worthington as Howard Light
 Mariel McClorey as Katie
 Sam Parsonson   as Dylan Feingold
 Claire van der Boom as Billie
 Sacha Horler    as P.K.
 Damon Herriman  as George Wagstaffe
 Justine Clarke  as Simone
 Adelaide Clemens as Harper

Series overview

Episodes
(Episode information retrieved from Australian Television Information Archive).

Season 1 (2004-05)

Season 2 (2006)

Season 3 (2007)

Awards and nominations

AACTA Awards
2015 Wins
 AACTA Subscription Television 20th Anniversary Award for Best Drama (one-off award)

Australian Film Institute Awards
The program has won many Australian Film Institute Awards.

2005 Wins
 Best Television Drama Series
 Best Direction in Television (for Jessica Hobbs)
 Best Television Screenplay
 Best Actress in Television (for Claudia Karvan)
 Best Supporting Actor in Television (for Max Cullen).

2005 Nominations
 Best Actor for Dan Wyllie
 Best Achievement in Screen Craft - Cinematography - for Louis Irving

2006 Wins
 Best Television Drama Series, making it the first show to win that title over two consecutive years in AFI history.

2006 Nominations
 Best Actress category for stars Claudia Karvan and Asher Keddie
 Best Actor for Dan Wyllie
 Best Direction in Television
 Best Television Screenplay

2007 Wins
 Best Television Drama Series
 Best Actress in Television (for Claudia Karvan)

2007 Nominations
 Best Actor for Ben Mendelsohn
 Best Supporting Actress for Justine Clarke
 Best Television Screenplay

TV Week Logie Awards
2005 Wins
 Most Outstanding Australian Drama

2005 Nominations
 Most Outstanding Actor - Brendan Cowell
 Most Outstanding Actor - Daniel Wyllie
 Most Outstanding Actress - Claudia Karvan
 Most Outstanding Actress - Asher Keddie

2006 Wins
 Most Outstanding Australian Drama
 Most Outstanding Actor - Daniel Wyllie
 Most Outstanding Actress - Claudia Karvan

2006 Nominations
 Most Outstanding Actor - Brendan Cowell
 Most Outstanding Actress - Asher Keddie

2007 Wins
 Most Outstanding Australian Drama

2007 Nominations
 Most Outstanding Actor - Ben Mendelsohn
 Most Outstanding Actor - Daniel Wyllie
 Most Outstanding Actress - Claudia Karvan
 Most Outstanding Actress - Asher Keddie
 Most Outstanding New Talent - Sam Parsonson
 Most Popular Actor - Brendan Cowell

2008 Nominations
 Most Outstanding Actress - Claudia Karvan
 Most Outstanding Actress - Asher Keddie
 Most Outstanding Actress - Asher Keddie
 Most Outstanding New Talent - Adelaide Clemens

ASTRAs
ASTRAs
 The series also has been nominated at almost every Australian television awards. At the ASTRA Awards (recognising talent in Cable television) it won awards in 2005 and 2006 for Claudia Karvan, Dan Wyllie and Best Drama Program. Asher Keddie and Daniel Wyllie won acting awards in 2007, and the show won Best Drama Program for a third consecutive year. In 2008 Claudia Karvan won her third ASTRA for the series. In its four years, the series was nomination for a total of 25 ASTRAs including nominations for stars Alex Cook, Brendan Cowell and Ben Mendelsohn.

Australian Cinematographers Society Awards
2005 Nominations
 Cinematographer Louis Irving was nominated for Best Cinematography in Television

Australian Screen Music Awards
2005 Wins
 Composer Stephen Rae won Best Music for Television

Screen Sound Awards for Best Achievement in Sound
2005, 2006, 2007 Nominated
 Best Sound In A Drama Series

Australian Directors Guild Awards
2007 Nominated
 Outstanding Direction in Television

Australian Editors Guild Awards
2007 Nominations
 Outstanding Editing in Television Drama

Australian Writers Guild Award
2008 Nominations
 Outstanding Screenplay: Brendan Cowell for episode "The Cemetery Gates"

2007 Wins
 Outstanding Screenplay: Tony McNamara for episode "Cold Blooded Creatures"

2007 Nominations
 Outstanding Screenplay: Brendan Cowell for episode "The King of the Castle"

2006 Nominations
 Outstanding Screenplay: Brendan Cowell for episode "I Know You"

2005 Wins
 Outstanding Screenplay: Louise Fox for episode "A Different Planet"

2005 Nominations
 Outstanding Screenplay: Jacquelin Perske for episode "Only Mortal"

International airings
Love My Way was aired as a primetime show in the UK on Five's spin-off channel Five Life (Now Fiver). In Sweden it airs on channel 4 (TV4) on Thursday evenings and it also aired in Ireland on RTÉ Two in the early hours of Sunday, Monday and Wednesday. It is also screened in Estonia on ETV during Sunday evenings, and in New Zealand on TVNZ Channel 2 during late Monday evenings. As well, Super Channel (Canada) carries Love My Way. In Mexico is screened on Cosmopolitan. The Netherlands as well.

References

External links 
 Foxtel
 Showtime
 Photos and Information at Australian Television Information Archive
 Love My Way at the National Film and Sound Archive
 
Love My Way - "What's in a Name" at Australian Screen Online

APRA Award winners
Fox8 original programming
Showcase (Australian TV channel) original programming
Australian drama television series
2004 Australian television series debuts
2007 Australian television series endings
Australian television soap operas
Television series by Endemol Australia
English-language television shows
Television shows set in New South Wales